Košarkarski klub Maribor, commonly referred to as KK Maribor or simply Maribor, was a professional basketball team based in Maribor, Slovenia. It has been a member of the Premier A Slovenian Basketball League from 2010 to 2015.

History

The club was founded in 2005 on the base of ŽKK Maribor youth school and KŠ Maribor.

Due to financial problems, the club's board announced bankruptcy on 10 April 2015. The club withdrew from all competitions, including youth selections.

Season-by-season records

Honours
Slovenian Second Division 
2009–10
Slovenian Third Division
2008–09

References

Basketball teams established in 2005
Basketball teams in Slovenia
Sport in Maribor
2005 establishments in Slovenia
Basketball teams disestablished in 2015
2015 disestablishments in Slovenia